Andrés Alarcón (born 22 May 1970) is an Ecuadorian former professional tennis player.

Born in Quito, Alarcón competed for the Ecuador Davis Cup team in 1989 and 1990. 

Alarcón reached a best singles ranking of 351 on the professional tour and featured in qualifying at the 1994 Wimbledon Championships, where he had wins over Stéphane Sansoni and Vince Spadea.

A coach at the IMG Bollettieri Academy in Florida, Alarcón has coached professional players including Austin Krajicek.

ATP Challenger finals

Doubles: 1 (0–1)

See also
List of Ecuador Davis Cup team representatives

References

External links
 
 
 

1970 births
Living people
Ecuadorian male tennis players
Sportspeople from Quito